August Nogara (February 28, 1896 – June 28, 1984) was an American cyclist. He competed in two events at the 1920 Summer Olympics. 
In the road race, he crashed after hitting a rooster, but managed to finish. Earlier, he fought in World War I.

References

External links
 

1896 births
1984 deaths
Cyclists from the Province of Vicenza
American male cyclists
Olympic cyclists of the United States
Cyclists at the 1920 Summer Olympics
Italian emigrants to the United States
American military personnel of World War I